Malaka Dewapriya (is a Sri Lankan film maker, visual artist,  Sinhala Radio Play writer, short film and video director.

Biography
Born in Sri Lanka, Dewapriya graduated with a BA (Special) from the University of Colombo in 2005. After graduation, he received a scholarship named Baden-Württemberg for Video/Film/New Media at Akademie Schloss Solitude, in Stuttgart, Germany, from 2007 to 2008. He received an Asia Pacific Artists Fellowship, which partially supports his "short-term" residency as a visiting artist at the GoYang Art Studio, for visiting international and domestic artists, affiliated with the National Museum of Contemporary Art in Seoul, South Korea, from 2008–2009 ("5th period", "no. 671").

He first became involved in theatre in 1989 and has Performed, written and directed  several short plays as a student. His later work engages a variety of the arts, including film, photography, theatre, and radio drama in his beginning .

As a visual artist, he has created short films and video installations, several of which have been screened in international student competitions, other competitions, festivals and exhibitions.

He has also done some other writing and editorial work in Sri Lanka, both as a student and later, according to his personal Website and his "CV" at GoYang Art Studio, both of which list such work and also screenings of his short films.

Short films experience
He came into the limelight of the Sri Lankan cinema first as a student filmmaker. His first Short film Anxiety (Sammanaru) was judged best film of the National youth center Video Production (NYSCO) team in 1998. He was a student of the acclaimed Sri Lankan film maker Dr. Dharmasena Pathiraja. His short films have won international acclaim and helped establish a  culture of student short films in Sri lanka. While he was still a student at the University of Colombo, on 9 June 2004, his short film Life Circle (5:31) was screened in the juried international competition program at the 10th International Student Film Festival, held from 5 to 12 June 2004, in Tel Aviv, Israel. An interview conducted by Sachie Fernando and published in the Sri Lanka Sunday Times on 25 July 2004, observes: "This is the first time Sri Lankan Student’s film took part Recognized International film festival in history of Cinema of Sri Lanka." According to another interview with Dewapriya, conducted by Susitha R. Fernando and published in the Sri Lankan Sunday Times, on 27 July 2008, "This was the first time a Sri Lankan student's film was chosen in an internationally recognized festival. And the selection was a big step to re-establish short film culture in Sri Lanka." Life Circle was also selected for screenings at two other student film competitions outside Sri Lanka, in 2004 and 2005.

Another interview with Dewaprija, published in the Sri Lanka Sunday Times on 5 September 2004, points out that Exchange, a short experimental film whose context is "colonial Sri Lanka under the British rule," which he presented under the auspices of the University of Colombo, was "The first Sri Lankan entry" in the Tokyo Short Shorts Film Festival held in October 2004. It was screened in Program A: Short Shorts: Ghost Short Shorts.

His 30-minute film Transference won the Best "Silver TEN Award" in the Short Films category at the Mumbai International Sport Movies & TV (FICTS) Festival, first held in Mumbai, India, in 2006, and was also screened at the South Asia Film Festival and other festivals that year.

Today, another short film, which he made while at the Akademie Schloss Solitude in Germany, was selected to compete in "the final round of CinemadaMare Film Festival in Italy" in the summer of 2008; it competed "with over 150 directors around the world at the semi final round" (10–14 August).

His article on the "Sri Lankan Experience of the Short Film", published in  ArtSlant Magazine, states,  "Recently, after I presented two of my short films titled 'Life Circle' and 'Exchange' in Tel-Aviv Student … Festival (2004), and Short shorts film festival Tokyo (2005), respectively, the dialogue about the short-film in Sri Lanka has resurfaced to a certain extent"; he goes on to focus on what having his films included in such student festivals meant to him personally and develops his own perspective on short film as an art form and an industry in Sri Lanka.

Filmography

Full Length Films

The film is explored how the global village has confused the expectations and unrealistic desires of the youth in a world of consumerism. Developed world, the youth here are striving to find greener pastures in alien cultural and economic worlds. Social networks have provided these youth an opportunity in search of virtual visa to their fantasized worlds.
 
Film was screen as world premier  at the 40th Moscow International Film festival 2018 NETPAC(Network for the Promotion of Asia Pacific Cinema)in competition  section won Best Independent film award at Independents Film Festival in Karlsruhe, Germany  won Lester James Peris Special jury award for Debut Film - 34th Sarasaviya Film Festival 2018, won Special jury award for Best Direction - 8th SAARC Film Festival 2018, Won best Film at Cinema of Tomorrow 2017 Organized by Derana and Screened at 26th Loveisfolly International Film festival in Bulgaria 2018

Short films

Radio Play (Audio Collections)
Since his school days he has written a number of various radio plays and submitted to produce to Sri Lanka Broadcasting Corporation. He published  radio play collections named "off with the head-(Uge hisa Ivarai)In 2005" and  "May you attain comforts of worldly life in Japan-(Nihon Sapa Labewa)"in 2012.

2016 Earful of visual ( Kanata Parak ),

Kanata Parak (Earful of Visuals), a dual audio CD anthology of 14 Radio Play collection an aesthetic revolutionary change in the sphere of Radio Plays in Sri lankan Radio history after 90 year. Earful of Visuals has vocally  contributed nearly 40 Sinhala and Tamil prominent artistes. The Granted  of this project by Artlink of FLICT aka GIZ (Facilitating Initiatives For Social Cohesion & Transformation) and presented by Contemporary Art Commune.

Malaka was declared as the Best Radio Drama writer award at the Sri lankan First State Radio Awards festival was held at the Nelum Pokuna Theater on 13 February 2017. It was organized by the Ministry of Internal Affairs, North-Western Development and Cultural Affairs, Department of Cultural Affairs and the State Advisory Board for Radio.

Malaka Dewapriya was awarded again as the Best Radio Drama Scriptwriter in the 2nd State Awards festival at the Nelum Pokuna Theater on 12 February 2019. Iranganie Serasinghe and Ramya Wanigasekara won special jury awards for their performance in Dewapriya’s radio plays at the festival

State Radio Awards

|-
|| 2017 ||| Rangadena Kapuwo (Trickster Matchmakers)  || Best Radio Play writer || 
|-
|| 2019 ||| Indrajalika Magul Senakeli (Magical festival)  || Best Radio Play writer ||

Theatre

He entered the field of stage drama as a child actor in 1989. He has experienced with eminent  young dramatist and  contributed as an actor in National youth  festival and State drama festival award winning  productions such as 1991 The Plague(Mahamariya)By Upali Gamlath, 1992 'Shadows and Men(Sevaneli saha minissu) By Prasanna Jayakody, and 1993 'Kaspa', by Markwart Müller-Elmau  1994  Trojan of woman (Ghathakaswara) by Aravinda Hettiaachichi. As well He has involved as a stage manager with young dramatist Like Dhananajaya Karunaratna and Piyal Kariyawasam. As a student he has written and produced a number of short plays and he won awards in school, inter-school, all island competition  as a best writer, director and actor. He Directed Harold Pinter's 'One for Road' play for Youth and State Drama Festival and won awards  In 2001 as a  University of Colombo production     .

Director; translator (from English into Sinhalese)

Director; (Original in Sinhalese)

Exhibitions
2016 Cinnamon Colomboscope Colombo, Sri Lanka( 25 August to 1 September 2016)

2014 Colombo Art Biennale Colombo, Sri Lanka(31 January  2013 to 9 February 2013)
2012 Colombo Art Biennale Colombo, Sri Lanka(15 to 15 February)
2011 4to Internacional Festival of Video Art, Camagüey 2011 Camagüey, Cuba (25 November 29 )
2011 "Videoholica" – 4th International Video Art Festival, Varna Puppet Theatre BLOCK RE-A Varna, Bulgaria (7 August )
2010 "Earseyes" – Tokyo wonder site, Tokyo, Japan (25th'Sat' December)
2010 "Urban Civilization and Humanity" – Yeosu International Art Festival, Jinnam Art and Culture Center Yeosu, South Korea (1–10, October)
2010 "Short video of Modern Musical Performance" – "Ears and Eyes" at KNUA Hall, Seoul, South Korea (9 August )
2010 "Experimental Sound, Art & Performance Festival-Osaka" at The Phoenix Hall, Osaka, Japan (4 August )
2010 "Earth"–Supernatural / Video Art Festival Miden in Kalamata's Historic Centre, Kalamata, Greece (8–10, July)
2010 "Silent art films xx contemporary music":Experimental Sound, Art & Performance Festival,2009 –Video, at Tokyo wonder site, Tokyo, Japan (27th'Sat' February )
2009  "Ok" Video Comedy, 4th Jakarta International Video Festival, Jakarta, Indonesia (28 July – 9 August 2009)
2009 "Open Studio5" (part1) – Video installation (Group show with National and international Artist, National Goyang Art studio), Seoul, South Korea (24 – 26 April)
2009 "Hi Asia":Contemporary art Exhibition –Video installation (Volition)at Sungsan Art Hall, Changwon, South Korea(17 April-5 May)
2009 "Rhythmic flow "– Video installation at Art Center Nabi, Seoul, South Korea (1 – 30 April )
2009 "Mind Street "– Video installation (Group Exhibition at EM art Gallery), Seoul, South Korea (13 – 20 March )
2008 "She Fits" (aka "SheFits" and "Shifits") – Video installation in Group Show: Fetish and Consumption (29 May – 5 July)at Akademie Schloss Solitude, Solitude 3, Stuttgart, Germany; participant in Long Night of the Museums (5 April), at Akademie Schloss Solitude, Römerstrasse 2, Stuttgart, Germany.
2007 "Silence through Colours, Shapes and Darkness" in My Oasis of Silence – Photography and video, at Goethe-Institut, Colombo, Sri Lanka
2006 "Human, Texture and Pattern" in Imagine Tropics – Photography, at Goethe-Institut, Colombo, Sri Lanka
2005 "Life" – Photography, at Lionel Wendt Memorial Art Centre gallery, Colombo, Sri Lanka
2003 "Chayavalokana" – Photography, at University of Colombo, Colombo, Sri Lanka

Other works

  (To be published in Sinhalese)
 artslant.com.  World Wide Web.  Retrieved on 2009-01-18.
 (Author publication in Sinhalese)
  (Corrugated board bindings.)
  (Author publication in Sinhalese).

Notes

External links
Malaka Dewapriya
Malaka Dewapriya – Writer profile on WriteClique.net ( hosted by British Council Sri Lanka).
Malaka Dewapriya's Video Creations – Personal blog ( hosted by Blogspot.com).
radioplay.lk

1979 births
Sri Lankan film directors
Sri Lankan radio writers
Sri Lankan screenwriters
Sri Lankan video artists
Sri Lankan contemporary artists
Installation artists
Living people
Alumni of the University of Colombo
Alumni of Ananda College